Pultenaea whiteana is a species of flowering plant in the family Fabaceae and is endemic to a restricted area of south-eastern Queensland. It is an erect shrub with linear leaves and yellow to orange flowers.

Description

Taxonomy and naming
Pultenaea whiteana was first formally described in 1951 by Stanley Thatcher Blake in The Queensland Naturalist from specimens he collected on Mount Maroon in "more or less heath-like vegetation on the upper rocky slopes" in 1948. The specific epithet (whiteana) honours Cyril Tenison White.

Distribution and habitat

References

whiteana
Flora of Queensland
Plants described in 1951
Taxa named by Stanley Thatcher Blake